The 1955–56 William & Mary Indians men's basketball team represented the College of William & Mary in intercollegiate basketball during the 1955–56 NCAA men's basketball season. Under the fourth year of head coach Boydson Baird, the team finished the season 12–14, 9–7 in the Southern Conference. This was the 51st season of the collegiate basketball program at William & Mary, whose nickname is now the Tribe. William & Mary played its home games at Blow Gymnasium.

The Indians finished in 5th place in the conference and qualified for the 1956 Southern Conference men's basketball tournament, held at the Richmond Arena. However, for the second consecutive year William & Mary fell to Richmond in the quarterfinals.

Program notes
William & Mary played one team for the first time this season: Rhode Island.

Schedule

|-
!colspan=9 style="background:#006400; color:#FFD700;"| Regular season

|-
!colspan=9 style="background:#006400; color:#FFD700;"| 1956 Southern Conference Basketball Tournament

Source

References

William & Mary Tribe men's basketball seasons
William and Mary Indians
William and Mary Indians Men's Basketball Team
William and Mary Indians Men's Basketball Team